Stonor Challenge Trophy is a rowing event for women's double sculls at the annual Henley Royal Regatta on the River Thames at Henley-on-Thames in England.

The event is open to members of any club but the crew must be of British Rowing Senior status in sculling. It was inaugurated in 2017.

Winners

References

Events at Henley Royal Regatta
Rowing trophies and awards